The 2015 Copa Sevilla was a professional tennis tournament played on clay courts. It was the 18th edition of the tournament which was part of the 2015 ATP Challenger Tour. It took place in Seville, Spain between 7 and 13 September 2015.

Singles main-draw entrants

Seeds

 1 Rankings are as of August 31, 2015.

Other entrants
The following players received wildcards into the singles main draw:
  Agustín Boje Ordóñez
  Jaume Munar
  Ricardo Ojeda Lara
  Mario Vilella Martinez

The following players received entry from the qualifying draw:
  Ivan Gakhov
  Juan Lizariturry
  Matwé Middelkoop
  David Vega Hernandez

Champions

Singles

  Pedro Cachín def.  Pablo Carreño, 7–5, 6–3

Doubles

  Wesley Koolhof /  Matwé Middelkoop def.  Marco Bortolotti /  Kamil Majchrzak, 7–6(7–5), 6–4

External links
Official Website

2015
2015 ATP Challenger Tour
2015 in Spanish tennis
September 2015 sports events in Spain